Theodor Bergqvist (13 May 1885 – 13 January 1969) was a Swedish wrestler. He competed in the middleweight event at the 1912 Summer Olympics.

References

External links

1885 births
1969 deaths
Olympic wrestlers of Sweden
Wrestlers at the 1912 Summer Olympics
Swedish male sport wrestlers
Sportspeople from Gothenburg